Yang He (born 3 February 1972) is a Chinese short track speed skater. He competed in the men's 5000 metre relay event at the 1994 Winter Olympics.

References

1972 births
Living people
Chinese male short track speed skaters
Olympic short track speed skaters of China
Short track speed skaters at the 1994 Winter Olympics
Place of birth missing (living people)
20th-century Chinese people